Cheyenne Hammond (born 29 July 1998) is an Australian rules footballer who plays for Port Adelaide in the AFL Women's competition (AFLW). 

Hammond was drafted by Gold Coast with the club's fifth pick and the 57th selection overall in the 2019 AFL Women's draft.

Hammond made her debut in round 1 of the 2020 season against Greater Western Sydney at Blacktown International Sportspark.

In June 2022, Hammond was traded to Port Adelaide.

Statistics 
Statistics are correct to the end of the 2020 season.

|- style="background-color:#EAEAEA"
! scope="row" style="text-align:center" | 2020
| 
| 29 || 7 || 0 || 2 || 29 || 14 || 43 || 8 || 16 || 0.0 || 0.3 || 4.1 || 2.0 || 6.1 || 1.1 || 2.3 || 
|- class="sortbottom"
! colspan=3 | Career
! 7 
! 0
! 2 
! 29 
! 14 
! 43 
! 8 
! 16
! 0.0
! 0.3 
! 4.1 
! 2.0 
! 6.1 
! 1.1 
! 2.3
! 
|}

References

External links 

1998 births
Living people
Port Adelaide Football Club (AFLW) players
Australian rules footballers from South Australia
South Adelaide Football Club players (Women's)
Gold Coast Football Club (AFLW) players
Christies Beach Football Club players